Sanghrajka is a surname which originated in India and belongs to Jain families. The name has its origins primarily in a small village called Jhar in Kathiawar in India.  The Sanghrajka families migrated from Jhar to the various towns of Gujarat such as Rajkot, Dhari, and Amreli.

It is believed that the surname was bestowed upon the family as an honour for the services  provided by the family to the Jain ascetics (Sangh).  Sanghrajka, simply means, those who take part in a Sangh i.e. procession.

Sanghrajka worship Naga-devata - named Satrasia  Bapa as Kuladevata and Khodiyar as Kuldevi. The temple of snake-god, Sri Satsaria Bapa is located at Dhasa in Gujarat.

In the 21st century, Sanghrajka families exist in many parts of India and countries like Kenya, UK, United States and Singapore.

References

Indian surnames
Surnames of Indian origin